Promise the Moon is a 1997 Western film by Kevin Sullivan, based on the book The Four Arrows Fe-As-Ko by Randall Beth Platt.  The script was adapted by Kevin Sullivan and Peter Behrens, and directed by Ken Jubenvill.

The film won a Gemini Award for Best Costume Design.

Plot summary
Ranch hand Roy Leckner (Henry Czerny) gets more than he bargained for when he agrees to fulfill his bosses dying wish to bring home his long lost son Levi (Shawn Ashmore) and teach him to take over the Four Arrows Ranch. Roy finds Levi unable to speak and living in an institution where he's been his entire life. Roy has no idea how he is going to be able to teach the boy anything and to make matters worse, Sir Robert Butler (David Fox) a local, cut throat businessman, is plotting to take over the ranch. Roy thinks the case is hopeless until Butler's former secretary Jane Makepeace (Colette Stevenson) joins forces with Roy to keep her greedy ex-employer at bay. The prim and proper Jane brings order to the household and discovers that Levi can't speak because he is deaf. Jane and Roy join forces to teach Levi to communicate and work on the ranch and an unlikely romance blossoms between them. In the end, in spite of their differences, Roy, Jane and Levi defeat Butler and forge a family in the process.

Cast List 
Henry Czerny – Royal Leckner
Colette Stevenson – Jane Makepeace
Shawn Ashmore – Leviatus Bennett
David Fox – Sir Robert Butler
Ricard Donat – Wilbur Bennett
Ken James — Charlie
Aidan Devine – James Bennett
Gloria May Eshkibok – Sophie Twelvetrees

External links

Sullivanmovies.com - Official Promise the Moon Page

References

1997 films
English-language Canadian films
1997 drama films
1990s adventure films
1997 Western (genre) films
Canadian Western (genre) films
Canadian drama television films
Western (genre) television films
1990s English-language films
1990s Canadian films